Vetrliði Sumarliðason was a 10th-century Icelandic skald.

He was the great-grandson of Ketill hængr ("salmon"), one of the settlers of Iceland. He lived in Fljótshlíð, in the south of the island.

Vetrliði was pagan and opposed the conversion to Christianity. He composed defamatory verses (níð) about Þangbrandr, a missionary sent to Iceland by Óláfr Tryggvason. He was killed by the priest (or by the priest and his companion Guðleifr Arason). In some versions, another skald, Þorvaldr veili, was murdered for the same reason. A stanza was composed by an unknown author about Vetrliði's death:

This episode is related in many sources: Kristni saga, Landnámabók, Brennu-Njáls saga, Snorri Sturluson's Óláfs saga Tryggvasonar and Óláfs saga Tryggvasonar en mesta.

Only one stanza of his work survived, a lausavísa praising Thor for having killed giants and giantesses:

Thou didst break the leg of Leikn,
Didst cause to stoop Starkadr,
Didst bruise Thrívaldi,
Didst stand on lifeless Gjálp.

—Skáldskaparmál (11), Brodeur's translation

References

External links
Vetrliði's lausavísa in the original language.

10th-century Icelandic poets
999 deaths
Icelandic male poets
Year of birth unknown